Glauco Venier (born 8 September 1962) is an Italian jazz pianist and composer.

Life and career
Venier was born in Sedegliano, Udine on 8 September 1962. He "graduated in organ and composition from the Udine Conservatory in 1985, then took private lessons with Franco d'Andrea before heading to Boston's Berklee School." "He has led his own bands since 1990".

Venier has performed and recorded as a trio with vocalist Norma Winstone and reeds player Klaus Gesing since the early 2000s. Their 2007 album Distances was nominated for a Grammy in the Best Jazz Vocal Album category.

Discography
An asterisk (*) indicates that the year is that of release.

As leader/co-leader

References

1962 births
Italian jazz pianists
Italian male pianists
Living people
21st-century pianists
21st-century Italian male musicians
Male jazz musicians